Holopelus is a genus of crab spiders that was first described by Eugène Louis Simon in 1886.

Species
 it contains seven species, found in Asia and Africa:
Holopelus albibarbis Simon, 1895 – Equatorial Guinea (Bioko), South Africa
Holopelus almiae Dippenaar-Schoeman, 1986 – South Africa
Holopelus bufoninus Simon, 1886 (type) – Indonesia (Sumatra)
Holopelus crassiceps (Strand, 1913) – Central Africa
Holopelus irroratus (Thorell, 1899) – Cameroon
Holopelus malati Simon, 1895 – India
Holopelus piger O. Pickard-Cambridge, 1899 – Sri Lanka

See also
 List of Thomisidae species

References

Further reading

Araneomorphae genera
Spiders of Africa
Spiders of Asia
Thomisidae